This is an incomplete list of lakes of Newfoundland and Labrador, a province of Canada.

Larger lake statistics

List of lakes

See also

List of lakes of Canada

References 

Newfoundland
 
Lakes